Unterweger is a surname. Notable people with the surname include:

 Clemens Unterweger (born 1992), Austrian ice hockey player
 Jack Unterweger (1950–1994), Austrian serial killer
 Lisa Unterweger (born 1995), Austrian cross-country skier